I, Anna is a 2012 British noir thriller film written and directed by Barnaby Southcombe and based on Elsa Lewin's novel of the same name. The film stars Southcombe's mother Charlotte Rampling alongside Gabriel Byrne and Hayley Atwell.

Plot
DCI Bernie Reid's latest case is the mystery of a man brutally murdered in a London apartment building. As an insomniac going through a divorce, Reid's concentration on the case is further complicated after an encounter with Anna, an enigmatic figure. He tracks her down to a party where she denies any knowledge of having already met him. Despite her protestations, there is a mutual attraction between them. Bernie's professional ethics come into question as he grows more attached to Anna, who is about to unveil a dark mystery.

Cast

Production
The film shot for 5 weeks in London, and 1 week in a Hamburg studio. Filming wrapped in March 2011.

Reception

References

External links
 
 
 

2012 films
2012 independent films
2012 psychological thriller films
British psychological thriller films
German psychological thriller films
French psychological thriller films
2010s English-language films
English-language German films
English-language French films
Film noir
Films set in London
Films shot in Hamburg
Films shot in London
British independent films
French independent films
German independent films
2010s British films
2010s French films
2010s German films